District of Columbia Organic Act may refer to:

 District of Columbia Organic Act of 1801, an act by the United States Congress which incorporated the District of Columbia and placed it under the exclusive control of Congress 
 District of Columbia Organic Act of 1871, an act by the United States Congress which created a single municipal government for the entire District of Columbia